National Democratic Congress may refer to:

 National Democratic Congress (Ghana)
 National Democratic Congress (Grenada)
 National Democratic Congress (Zambia)

See also
National Democratic Party (Egypt)